Rashad Ismayilov — Ambassador of Republic of Azerbaijan to Qatar(2018—2022). Consul General of Azerbaijan Republic in Batumi, Georgia (2015—2018).

Early years 
Rashad Ismayilov was born on 7 June 1974 in Baku, then capital of the Azerbaijani SSR. He received his primary and secondary education in №7 secondary school named after Mammad Rahim and finished the school in 1991. He went to Law Faculty of the Baku State University and graduated from it with a diploma. Furthermore, he also graduated from Finance and Credit Faculty Azerbaijan State University of Economics. After finishing his higher education, Ismayilov become the head of "Həyat" (Life) Non-Governmental Organization's Department of International Law.

Diplomatic career 
From 2003 to 2005 he became the leader of the "Progress program for elimination of the poverty" project, organized by Azerbaijani Mission of the United Nations. After that, he participated in various projects such as "Progress program of the National Social Defense System" and "Progress of the National Social Defence System".

On 10 September 2015 Ismayilov received the rank of Second-class Extraordinary and Plenipotentiary Ambassador of Azerbaijan. Same year, he became the Consul General of Azerbaijan Republic in Batumi, Georgia. Three years later, on 7 February 2018 President Ilham Aliyev signed a decree that would make Rashad Ismayilov the Extraordinary and Plenipotentiary Ambassador of Republic of Azerbaijan to the Qatar.

References

Living people
1974 births
Ambassadors of Azerbaijan to Georgia (country)
Ambassadors of Azerbaijan to Qatar
Baku State University alumni
Azerbaijan State University of Economics alumni
Diplomats from Baku